"Us Against the World" is a song by Irish boy band Westlife from their eighth studio album Back Home (2007). The song was released as the album's second single on 3 March 2008.

The song was written by Arnthor Birgisson, Rami Yacoub and Savan Kotecha. A music video for the song was filmed in December 2007 and premiered on 14 February 2008.

Background
The song was composed by Arnthor Birgisson, Rami Yacoub and Savan Kotecha, who also co-wrote numerous tracks on the Back Home album, namely "Something Right", "The Easy Way", and "Pictures in My Head". The single was officially confirmed by band member Nicky Byrne during an X Factor interview, which later appeared on the band's official website. "Us Against the World" was also dedicated to Westlife's fans worldwide to mark their continuous support. The band gave their first live performance of "Us Against The World" on the TV special "The Westlife Show – Live", which was broadcast on 15 December 2007. In the Philippines, both the song and music video premiered on 3 July 2008, the band's anniversary date.

Critical reception
Digital Spys Alex Fletcher rated the album  and said: "Westlife have claimed that 'Us Against the World' is the best track on their recent Back Home album, so, if nothing else, we should be grateful that the record company chose to release this rather than one of the tracks the soppy Irish warblers weren't as impressed with."

Chart performance
It debuted at number 193 on its first week making it as one of their highest leapers in the UK Singles Chart recorded history with "Unbreakable", "Mandy" and "The Rose". Prior to its physical release, the song managed to peak at number 40 on the UK on its second week and at number 27 on the Official Irish Singles Chart based on downloads alone. On 3 March 2008 the single was released in its physical format, climbing 32 spots to peak at number eight on the UK Singles Chart, number two on Scottish Singles Chart, and number six on the Irish Singles Chart. The single peaked also at number 14 on UK TV Airplay Chart and number 24 on UK Radio Airplay Chart. A live version of the single was also made available for download. This marks the first time in Westlife's history that a single had reached the top five in Ireland, making "Us Against The World" the band's lowest-charting single to date. Despite the history, the single made it to the top 184 of the best-selling singles in the UK in that year.

Many fans have blamed the record label, Sony BMG, for putting the song up for download two weeks prior to the physical release of the single as well as choosing to release it during the Back Home Tour, thus resulting in inadequate single promotion. A similar situation occurred back in 2002 when "Bop Bop Baby" was released while the band was on tour. On 4 May 2008 the song re-entered the UK Singles Chart at number 74. This is believed to be due to a performance from the group on the live final of Britain's Got Talent.

Music video
The band announced through their official website that the video began shoot on 4 December 2007. The music video marks a major milestone in the band's decade of music. The video premiered on 14 February, while the single was released on 3 March 2008. The initial video, which featured both the lads and their loved ones, was shot at the Twickenham Stadium in London over a two-day span. Louis Walsh, the band's manager, had a cameo role in it. However, the band had a reshoot of the music video due to Simon Cowell's disapproval of the initial video outcome. This might have caused the release date to be pushed back to 3 March from the initial date of 25 February. The video shows the band walking through a staged red carpet segment, inside the backseat of a moving car, spending time with their loved ones along with photos and videos of their past decade. Noticeably absent from the video though is Mark's then partner Kevin. No explanation was ever offered as to why he was not included in the final video. Former Westlife member Brian McFadden appears in archive footage.

Track listing
UK CD1
 "Us Against the World" (Single Mix)
 "Get Away"

UK CD2
 "Us Against the World" (Single Mix)
 "I'm Already There" (Ashanti Boyz Remix)
 "Us Against the World" (The Wideboys Remix Radio Edit)

Charts

Weekly charts

Year-end charts

References

2007 songs
2008 singles
Westlife songs
Songs written by Rami Yacoub
Songs written by Savan Kotecha
Songs written by Arnthor Birgisson
Pop ballads
Sony BMG singles
Soul ballads
2000s ballads
Sony Music singles
RCA Records singles